Cezar Bononi (born June 15, 1986) is a Brazilian professional wrestler currently signed to All Elite Wrestling. He is also known for his time in WWE NXT from October 2015 to April 2020.

Early life
Prior to his wrestling career Bononi played American football for São Paulo Storm in the Brazilian football league, being named to the São Paulo state team and the All Brazilian team.

Professional wrestling career

Early career 
Bononi trained to be a professional wrestler under Bob Junior of the Brazilian Wrestling Federation, and competed on the independent circuit in his native Brazil and South America under the ring name V8 Big Block. In the BWF, he held the BWF Rei Do Ringue Championship on one occasion.

WWE (2015–2020) 
In October 2015, Bononi was announced as part of a class of 19 WWE recruits to begin training at the WWE Performance Center. He made his television debut on the May 10, 2017 episode of NXT, losing to Aleister Black. Bononi had his first televised victory on the May 31 episode of NXT, defeating Andrade "Cien" Almas. Bononi was named "Future Star of NXT" at the 2017 NXT Year-End Awards. On April 17, 2020, it was announced that he was released from his WWE contract.

All Elite Wrestling (2020–present) 
On the June 24, 2020 episode of AEW Dynamite, Bononi was spotted in the crowd along with other wrestlers where he broke up a brawl between participants of a lumberjack. Bononi would then make his in-ring debut on the September 29 episode of AEW Dark where he teamed with Shawn Dean in a losing effort to The Gunn Club. Over the next few months, Bononi would compete sporadically on Dark in losing efforts. On the January 26, 2021 episode of Dark, Bononi would align himself with Peter Avalon. Bononi had his first win in AEW on the February 3 episode of Dark, teaming with Avalon to defeat Carlie Bravo and Shawn Dean. Bononi made his first in-ring appearance on the February 4 episode of Dynamite, teaming with Avalon in a loss to the team of Lee Johnson and Cody Rhodes. At Revolution, Bononi and Avalon took part in the Tag Team Casino Battle Royale in a losing effort.

Championship and accomplishments
Brazilian Wrestling Federation
BWF Rei Do Ringue Championship (1 time)
Pro Wrestling Illustrated
 Ranked No. 423 of the top 500 singles wrestlers in the PWI 500 in 2019
WWE
NXT Year-End Award (1 time)
Future Star of NXT (2017)

References

External links
Cezar Bononi on WWE.com

1986 births
All Elite Wrestling personnel
Living people
Brazilian male professional wrestlers
Brazilian players of American football
Sportspeople from São Paulo
21st-century professional wrestlers